The Drupal Association is an educational non-profit organization that tasks itself with fostering and supporting the Drupal software project, the community and its growth. Supported by both individual members and organizations, the Association uses its resources, network and funds to constantly engage in new projects and initiatives to help educate people about Drupal and support the growth of the Drupal project.

The Drupal Association does not control or direct code development of Drupal.

Mission 

The Drupal Association fosters and supports the Drupal software project, the community and its growth by: maintaining the hardware and software infrastructure of Drupal.org and other community sites, empowering the Drupal community, protecting the GPL source code of the Drupal project, organizing and promoting worldwide events (see DrupalCon), and communicating the benefits of Drupal.

Staff 

The Drupal Association's executive director is currently Heather Rocker. Megan Sanicki served as the executive director from 2016 to 2018. Holly Ross served as the executive director from 2013 to 2016, and was preceded by Jacob Redding (2010-2013)

History 

 2006 - Drupal VZW is formed as a Brussels non-profit organization, and the "Drupal Association" is announced at DrupalCon Brussels.
 2008 - DrupalCon, Inc. is incorporated in the United States for facilitating production of North American DrupalCon events.
 2010 - DrupalCon, Inc. is granted US 501(c)3 non-profit status.
 2011 - The Drupal VZW Board votes to request that DrupalCon, Inc. assume most responsibilities of the Drupal Association.  DrupalCon. Inc. formally assumes the business name "Drupal Association" and begins acting as the legal body to support the worldwide Drupal community.
 2012 - Broad based elections held for "at-large" directors to join the board to represent the community.
 2013 - Holly Ross hired to serve as executive director, replacing Jacob Redding.
 2014 - Dries Buytaert filed for US Federal Trademark for the Drupal word mark, in his individual capacity. An Assignment has not been recorded to Drupal VZW, Drupal Association, or Drupalcon, Inc. 
 2016 - Megan Sanicki appointed executive director
 2018 - Tim Lehnen appointed interim executive director
 2019 - Heather Rocker appointed executive director
 2020 - As part of the COVID-19 pandemic, the company received between $150,000 and $350,000 in federally backed small business loans from Beneficial State Bank as part of the Paycheck Protection Program. The company stated it would allow them to retain 14 jobs.

References

Free and open-source software organizations
Charities based in Oregon